Simon Trevitt (born 20 December 1967) is an English former professional footballer, born in Dewsbury, West Yorkshire, who played in the Football League as a defender for Huddersfield Town, Hull City and Swansea City.

He was listed as a Huddersfield Town fans' favourite in a 2006 survey. The survey was conducted by Huddersfield Town supporters group and surveyed up to 10,000 people.

He plays cricket for Liversedge cricket club and used to manage the junior team of the village's football club before retiring fully from the game.

References

External links
 

1967 births
Living people
Association football defenders
English Football League players
English footballers
Footballers from Dewsbury
Guiseley A.F.C. players
Huddersfield Town A.F.C. players
Hull City A.F.C. players
Swansea City A.F.C. players